Age of Winters is the debut album by American heavy metal band The Sword, released in the United States on February 14, 2006. The Japanese edition, released by record label Toy's Factory, contains three bonus tracks recorded live at the CBGB club in New York City on April 9, 2006. The single released from the album was "Freya", which did not chart. Age of Winters was later reissued as part of a two-disc box set with Gods of the Earth on November 25, 2008.

Reception 

The Sword's debut album received a widely positive critical reaction. Reviewing for music website AllMusic, critic Eduardo Rivadavia awarded Age of Winters 4.5 out of 5 rating stars, qualifying it as an "AMG Album Pick". In the review, Rivadavia claims that the band's debut record "sees them joining California's High on Fire, Sweden's Witchcraft, and Australia's Wolfmother (to name but a few) at the forefront of what's gradually become known in the mid-'00s as the "heritage" or "retro-metal" movement." He goes on to suggest that "the album's main attraction [is] its megalithic guitar work," concluding that "Age of Winters provides [...] listeners with as good an entryway as any into the "retro-metal" universe, while also managing to sound refreshing even to calloused heavy metal ears," which, he suggests, "is no small achievement."

Other reviews of Age of Winters were similarly positive – webzine PopMatters, awarded the album a favorable rating of seven out of ten, describing it as "one fine, headbang-inducing beast of a debut record," while The Austin Chronicle summarised the album as "literate" and "visceral".

In popular culture
"Freya" appears as a playable song in Guitar Hero II and Guitar Hero Smash Hits. as well as the soundtrack of Burnout Dominator, and Wayne. "Barael's Blade" was used in the season five American Dad! episode "Rapture's Delight". "Celestial Crown" is featured on the Jennifer's Body soundtrack. "Iron Swan" appears in the 2006 video game Tony Hawk's Project 8 and also appears in season nine American Dad! episode "Minstrel Krampus".

Track listing

Personnel 

The Sword
 J. D. Cronise – vocals, guitars, production, mixing
 Kyle Shutt – guitars, mixing
 Bryan Richie – bass, engineering, mixing
 Trivett Wingo – drums, mixing

Additional personnel
 Mike Groener – additional vocal engineering
 Rick Essig – mastering
 Conrad Keely – artwork

Release history

References

The Sword albums
2006 debut albums